The 2014–15 Serie A season was the 81st season of the Serie A, the top level of ice hockey in Italy. 12 teams participated in the league, and Asiago Hockey won the championship. Ritten Sport won the League Cup.

Regular season

External links 
 Lega Italiana Hockey Ghiaccio website
 Elite Prospects

Ita
Serie A
Serie A (ice hockey) seasons